Ducktown is a historically Italian-American district of Atlantic City, New Jersey, United States, stretching from Missouri Avenue to Texas Avenue. The Press of Atlantic City called the neighborhood "Atlantic City's Little Italy".

History
Italian immigrants heavily settled Ducktown in the early 20th century and named it for the duck houses they built along the bayfront, where they raised poultry and waterfowl. As with many American ethnic neighborhoods, after World War II, residents began leaving the neighborhood for automobile suburbs, sending Ducktown into a decline. Pitney Village, a housing project built in the neighborhood, was widely seen as contributing to the decline.

St. Michael's Roman Catholic Church has been cited as a focal point of the neighborhood before and after the decline. By the 1990s some families, mostly Hispanic and Asian, were returning to the neighborhood, and the Pitney Village housing project was demolished, leading to a renewal of the community.

Population
Ducktown has a large Italian-American community, and Italian flags can  be seen adorning buildings. Mobsters Nicodemo Scarfo and Salvatore Merlino once lived in Ducktown.

Attractions
The district has a number of Atlantic City attractions including:

Entertainment venues
Boardwalk Hall on Mississippi Avenue and the Boardwalk
Dante Hall Theater on Mississippi Avenue
The Noyes Arts Garage of Stockton University on the corner of Mississippi Avenue and Fairmount Avenue

Churches
St. Michael's Roman Catholic Church on Mississippi Avenue

Food
The White House Sub Shop on Arctic Avenue - Known for the A-list celebrities who frequent this establishment, the White House was opened by Anthony Basile, along with Alfred "Fritz" Sacco, in 1946 when Basile came back from the army while serving in the Philippines. It has been family owned and operated for over 60 years.
Angelo's Fairmount Tavern on Fairmount Avenue - Family owned and operated since 1935, the restaurant is known for its Italian cuisine as well as steaks and seafood.
Angeloni's II on Arctic and Georgia Avenues - Family owned and operated since 1981, the restaurant is known for its Italiane cuisine and expansive wine list. 
Dock's Oyster House on Atlantic Avenue - Atlantic City's oldest restaurant (circa 1897), it features a pianist on many nights.
The Ducktown Tavern on Georgia Avenue - A newly renovated bar and restaurant.
Russo's Liquor Store - Located on the corner of Florida and Pacific Avenues, has been there since 1973 and is the original Ducktown liquor store.

Italian bakeries
Ducktown had several bakeries; there are two still in operation:
Formica Brothers Bakery and Café – Established in 1919 by Francesco Formica, Formica Brothers Bakery moved to its current location in 1928.  Frank D. Formica, third generation owner/operator recently transformed the retail bakery shop located at 2310 Arctic Avenue into a cafe (open daily 7 am – 7 pm, Wi-Fi enabled) serving Seattle's Best coffee.  The bakery produces over 30,000 loaves of bread a day for over 300 corporate accounts, including local casinos and restaurants.  Product offerings: Italian sub loaves, artisan breads, cannolis, cookies, biscotti, tomato pie.  
A. Rando Bakery – Opened in 1909, this bakery focuses on producing subs, dinner rolls, and table bread for area stores and restaurants.

Transportation
The Atlantic City Rail Terminal is located one block from Ducktown at Arkansas and Fairmount Avenues. It is the southern terminus of New Jersey Transit's Atlantic City Line to Philadelphia.
The Atlantic City Bus Terminal is located four blocks from Ducktown at Michigan and Atlantic Avenues. It provides scheduled service by both Greyhound Lines and New Jersey Transit.
The Atlantic City Jitney Association provides minibus service between Ducktown and other Atlantic City neighborhoods.

Notes

External links
City of Atlantic City - Ducktown

Atlantic City, New Jersey
Neighborhoods in Greater Atlantic City, New Jersey
Italian-American culture in New Jersey
Little Italys in the United States
Ethnic enclaves in New Jersey